A piteraq is a cold katabatic wind which originates on the Greenlandic icecap and sweeps down the east coast. The word "piteraq" means "that which attacks you" in the local language. Piteraqs are most common in the autumn and winter. Wind speeds typically reach 50 to 80 m/s (180–288 km/h; 111–178 mph).

The Greenland ice sheet cools the air directly above it. Colder air is denser and it sinks, forming a separate layer of cold air in between warmer air. A piteraq is triggered by low pressure systems off the east coast of Greenland. Piteraqs do not only affect coastal towns, but also large areas of sea to the east of Greenland.

On February 6, 1970 at about 6:00 PM, the community of Tasiilaq was hit by the worst documented piteraq ever in Greenland (estimated at 90 m/s — about 325 km/h or 200 mph) (Stronger than a category five Atlantic hurricane) causing severe damage. Since the beginning of 1970, special piteraq warnings have been issued by the Danish Meteorological Institute.

See also 
 Williwaw
Bora (wind)
Mistral (wind)
Santa Ana winds
Oroshi

References 

Winds
Environment of Greenland